The Georgia national under-19 football team is the national under-19 football team of Georgia and is controlled by the Georgian Football Federation.

References

under-19
European national under-19 association football teams